Piscina is a comune (municipality) in the Metropolitan City of Turin in the Italian region Piedmont, located about 25 km southwest of Turin.

Piscina borders the following municipalities: Cumiana, Pinerolo, Frossasco, Airasca, and Scalenghe. Part of the municipal territory was involved in the Battle of Marsaglia in 1693.

Main sights
Baroque parish  church of St. Gratus (18th century), designed by Giuseppe Gerolamo Buniva
Communal Wing (1699)
Chapel of St. Roch (16th century)
Museum of Peasant Art

Twin towns
 Suardi, Argentina,  since 2006

See also 
 Tavernette

References

Cities and towns in Piedmont